Umbusi River is a river in Jõgeva County, Estonia. The river is 45.5 km long and basin size is 159.2 km2. It runs into Pedja River.

Trouts and Thymallus thymallus live also in the river.

References

Rivers of Estonia
Jõgeva County